Erugosquilla is a genus of crustaceans belonging to the family Squillidae. The genus was first described in 1995 by Raymond Brendan Manning. The type species is Erugosquilla massavensis .

Species
Species accepted by WoRMS:
Erugosquilla grahami 
Erugosquilla hesperia 
Erugosquilla massavensis 
Erugosquilla septemdentata 
Erugosquilla serenei 
Erugosquilla woodmasoni

References

Stomatopoda
Malacostraca genera
Taxa named by Raymond B. Manning